Erl or ERL may refer to:

People 
 Elli Erl (born 1979), German musician
 Hans Erl (1882–1942?), German operatic bass
 Sebastian Erl, German singer
 Thomas Erl (born 1967), Canadian author

Transport 
 ERL (automobile manufacturer), a defunct Swedish automobile manufacturer
 Eastern Region MRT line, in Singapore
 Erenhot Saiwusu International Airport, in China
 Express Rail Link, in Kuala Lumpur, Malaysia
 Euralair, a defunct French airline

Other uses 
 Erl, a municipality in Tyrol, Austria
 Eastern Refinery Limited, a state-owned oil refinery in Bangladesh
 Eastern Regional Libraries, in Victoria, Australia
 Effects range low
 Electronic Reference Library
 Energy recovery linac
 Engineering Research Laboratories, a national laboratory of Pakistan
 Environmental Research Letters, an open-access peer-reviewed journal
 Erlang (programming language)
 Estonian Patriotic Movement, a defunct Estonian political pressure group
 People's Union of Estonia, a defunct political party of Estonia
 VW Electronics Research Laboratory, a division of Volkswagen

See also 
 Erle (disambiguation)